Inflate to 45 RPM is the first vinyl recording by Canadian ska punk band The Planet Smashers. It contains three tracks, two of which were put on their following recording, Attack of The Planet Smashers. The last track, an instrumental, is a cover of a song by The Intimidators. The first 500 copies were on red vinyl, and hand-numbered, with subsequent copies on black vinyl. The record is considered highly collectable by fans of the band.

Track listing
Side A:
The 80 Bus

Side B:
Uncle Gordie
Beans

Personnel
Dave Cooper (drums)
Travis Wilkinson (trombone, organ)
Matt Collyer (vocals, guitar)
Ceco Munaretto (bass guitar)
Andrew Skowronski (tenor saxophone)

1995 singles
The Planet Smashers albums